David John may refer to:

David John (Mormon) (1833–1908)
David John (snooker player) (born 1984),  or Dai John, Welsh snooker player
Dai John or David John, Welsh rugby player
David Gwilym John, Welsh cartoonist

See also

David Johns (disambiguation)
David St. John (born 1949), American poet
John David (disambiguation)